Antonis Tsiaras (born 7 September 1993) is a Greek professional footballer who plays as a defensive midfielder for Super League 2 club Panachaiki.

Career
Tsiaras started his career from the AE Larissa's youth academies in 2008, in the age of 14.  In January 2012 he caught the attention of Bozidar Bandovic, who by that time was the team's head coach and was impressed by the young player's talent and decided to promote him.  Eventually on January 22, 2012 Tsiaras signed a 5-year professional contract and moved to the first squad.

Club statistics

External links
 
 Professional contract at onsports.gr
 Professional Debut at arenalarissa.gr
 First Goal & Interview at onsports.gr
 ΑΝΤΩΝΙΟΣ ΤΣΙΑΡΑΣ Στατιστικά 2020-2021

1993 births
Living people
Greek footballers
Association football midfielders
Super League Greece players
Athlitiki Enosi Larissa F.C. players
Xanthi F.C. players
Aris Thessaloniki F.C. players
Pierikos F.C. players
Panthrakikos F.C. players
Apollon Smyrnis F.C. players
Olympiacos Volos F.C. players
Trikala F.C. players
Ayia Napa FC players
Cypriot Second Division players
Greek expatriate footballers
Greek expatriate sportspeople in Cyprus
Expatriate footballers in Cyprus
Footballers from Larissa